The Asian Journal of Legal Education is a blind peer reviewed academic journal. It is a forum for academic research and dialogue about the reform of legal education in the Asian Region.

The journal is published twice a year by SAGE Publications (New Delhi) in collaboration with the West Bengal National University of Juridical Sciences.

This journal is a member of the Committee on Publication Ethics (COPE).

Abstracting and indexing 
Asian Journal of Legal Education is abstracted and indexed in:
 J-Gate

External links

References 

 http://publicationethics.org/members/asian-journal-legal-education

SAGE Publishing academic journals
Publications established in 2014
Law journals